Under the Constitution of Canada, the responsibility for enacting and enforcing labour laws, including the minimum wage, rests primarily with the ten Provinces of Canada. The three Territories of Canada have a similar power, delegated to them by federal legislation. Some provinces allow lower wages to be paid to liquor servers and other gratuity earners or to inexperienced employees.

The Government of Canada has the constitutional authority to set minimum wages only for employees within federal jurisdiction, such as federal public servants and workers in industries that are under federal regulatory jurisdiction, such as banks, airlines and interprovincial railways. The federal government earlier set its own minimum wage rates for workers under its jurisdiction. In 1996, however, the federal minimum wage was re-defined to be the general adult minimum wage rate of the province or territory where the work is performed. Following the 2021 budget, the Government of Canada reestablished a federal minimum wage for federally regulated industries on December 29, 2021.

Demographics

In 2013, 50% of minimum wage workers were between the ages of 15 and 19; in 1997, it was 36%. 50.2% of workers in this age group were paid minimum wage in 2013, an increase from 31.5% in 1997. Statistics Canada notes that "youth, women and persons with a low level of education were the groups most likely to be paid at minimum wage."

According to one study, in 2019, 62% of people on minimum wage in Quebec worked part time, and 61% were aged 15 to 24.

Minimum wage levels by jurisdiction 

Assuming a 40-hour workweek and 52 paid weeks per year, the annual gross employment income of an individual earning the minimum wage in Canada is between C$27,040 (in Saskatchewan) and C$33,280 (in Nunavut).

The following table lists the hourly minimum wages for adult workers in each province and territory of Canada. The provinces which have their minimum wages in bold allow for lower wages under circumstances which are described under the "Comments" heading.

Note: The following table can be sorted by Jurisdiction, Wage, or Effective date using the  icon.

See also 
 Minimum wage
 List of minimum wages by country

References

External links

Canada law-related lists
Minimum wage
Canada
Canadian labour law